The 2018–19 Youngstown State Penguins men's basketball team represented Youngstown State University during the 2018–19 NCAA Division I men's basketball season. The Penguins, led by second-year head coach Jerrod Calhoun, played their home games at the Beeghly Center as members of the Horizon League. They finished the season 12–20, 8–10 in Horizon League play to finish in a three-way tie for sixth place. They lost in the quarterfinals of the Horizon League tournament to Oakland.

Previous season
The Penguins finished the 2017–18 season 8–24, 6–12 in Horizon League play to finish in a tie for eighth place. They lost in the first round of the Horizon League tournament to Cleveland State.

Roster

Schedule and results

|-
!colspan=9 style=| Non-Conference regular season

|-
!colspan=9 style=| Horizon League regular season

|-
!colspan=9 style=|Horizon League tournament
|-

|-

References

Youngstown State Penguins men's basketball seasons
Youngstown
Youngstown State Penguins men's b
Youngstown State Penguins men's b